The Collection was released in 2004 and is a compilation album of British rock band New Model Army songs.

Track listing
"Stupid Questions" (Justin Sullivan) – 3:27
"225" (Sullivan, Robert Heaton) – 4:47
"Eleven Years" (Sullivan, Heaton) – 3:51
"Courage" (Sullivan, Heaton) – 3:16
"Space" (Sullivan, Heaton, Nelson) – 3:24
"Heroes" (Sullivan) – 4:04
"51st State" (Ashley Cartwright, New Model Army) – 2:33
"Vanity" (Sullivan) – 5:30
"No Rest" (Sullivan, Stuart Morrow, Heaton) – 5:20
"Ballad of Bodmin Pill" (Sullivan, Heaton) – 4:47
"Deadeye" (Sullivan) – 4:51
"Smalltown England" (live) (Sullivan) – 4:11
"Drag it Down" (Sullivan, Morrow, Heaton) – 3:25
"The Charge" (Sullivan, Heaton) – 2:24
"I Love the World" (live) (Sullivan, Heaton) – 5:29

New Model Army (band) compilation albums
2004 compilation albums